Manasseh Lomole Waya is a South Sudanese politician. He has served as Deputy Governor and Minister of Education of Central Equatoria since 2005.

References

Living people
People from Central Equatoria
Year of birth missing (living people)
Place of birth missing (living people)
21st-century South Sudanese politicians